Archedemus or Archedamus ( or Άρχέδαμος) was the name of a number of different people from classical antiquity:
 Archedemus of Athens, an Athenian leader in the 5th century BCE
 Archedemus of Pelekes (Ὁ Πήληξ), a speaker mentioned by Aeschines who is otherwise unknown but should be distinguished from the preceding
 Archedemus of Aetolia, an Aetolian who commanded the Aetolian troops which assisted the Romans in the Second Macedonian War with Philip V of Macedon
 Archedemus of Tarsus, stoic philosopher from the 2nd century BCE
 Archedemus of Thera, stone worker, sculptor 5th century BCE. He transformed the Vari Cave into a sanctuary dedicated to Pan, the Nymphs and the Charites.